Sherif Durim Sadiku (born 15 December 1998) is an Albanian professional footballer who plays as a striker for Shkumbini Peqin in the Albanian First Division.

Club career
He played for Shkumbini Peqin in the 2018–19 campaign, collecting 15 league appearances with no goals.

Sadiku returned to his boyhood club Elbasani for the 2018–19 season. He scored his first professional goal on 8 December 2018 in a 2–0 home win over Turbina Cërrik to remove his side from the last position in championship.

Personal life
His brother, Armando Sadiku, is also a professional footballer who plays for Legia Warsaw and the Albania national team.

Career statistics

References

External links
 Profile - FSHF

1998 births
Living people
Footballers from Elbasan
Albanian footballers
Association football forwards
KF Elbasani players
KS Shkumbini Peqin players
Kategoria e Parë players